Nadanthathu Enna? is a 2016-2016 Indian Tamil language anthology and crime television series. The first season aired 2009  and The 2nd season premiered on 29 August 2016 aired Monday to Friday at 10:00PM (IST) on Vijay TV. Starting from 31 October 2016, the show shifted to aired at 10:30PM (IST) which shows the claims of paranormal happenings around India. The Show host by News presenter and TV Actor Vikraman Radhakrishnan. The show last aired on 3 December 2016 and ended with 53 episodes.

List of Episodes

Airing history 
The show started airing on Vijay TV on 29 August 2016 and it aired Monday through Friday at 10:00PM (IST).  Starting from Monday 31 October 2016 air time changed to a 10:30PM (IST) time slot. A new comedy show named Sirippuda replaced this show at 10:00PM (IST) and lasted three episodes.  It was  aired every Saturday at 2:00PM (IST).

References

External links
Official website
Star Vijay on YouTube
Star Vijay US
Star Vijay Malaysia

Star Vijay original programming
Tamil-language reality television series
Tamil-language crime television series
Tamil-language horror fiction television series
2016 Tamil-language television series debuts
2016 Tamil-language television series endings